Manny Fernandez may refer to:
Manny Fernandez (American football) (born 1946), American football player for the Miami Dolphins
Manny Fernandez (ice hockey) (born 1974),  ice hockey goaltender
Manny Fernandez (wrestler) (born 1954), former wrestler

See also
Manuel Fernandez (disambiguation)
Manuel Fernandes (disambiguation)